Moud-e Olya (also Romanized as Mūd-e ‘Olyā; also known as Mūd, Mavād and Murād) is a village in Darmian Rural District, in the Central District of Darmian County, South Khorasan Province, Iran. At the 2006 census, its population was 134, in 27 families.

References 

Populated places in Darmian County